The Russian Penguins were a professional touring Russian ice hockey club that competed in the 1993–94 IHL season, playing one game against each of the 13 teams involved in the regular IHL season. The results of the games played by the Russian Penguins counted in the standings for that season. The Penguins finished with a record of 2 wins, 9 losses, and 2 overtime losses earning them 6 points.

In 1993, Pittsburgh Penguins owner Howard Baldwin bought a 50% interest in the struggling HC CSKA Moscow team and signed a management contract to run that club's arena. The aim was to provide the team with Western sponsorship and much-needed capital, as well as providing the Pittsburgh club with easier access to Russian players. The partnership lasted two years until Baldwin and other sponsors pulled out.

Nikolai Khabibulin was the most notable player on that roster.  Other roster highlights included former first-round draft pick Yan Golubovsky and former New Jersey Devils forward Sergei Brylin.

The history of the Pittsburgh Penguins investment in the team is chronicled in Gabe Polsky's critically acclaimed 2019 documentary Red Penguins. The film features interviews with Howard Baldwin, Steven Warshaw, and CSKA General Manager at the time Valery Gushin.

Team statistics
Players

Goalkeepers

External links
 Russian Penguins roster at Hockey Database

 

International Hockey League (1945–2001) teams
Ice hockey teams in Russia
1993–94 in Russian ice hockey